Giovanni Battista Malaspina (1589–1655) was a Roman Catholic prelate who served as Bishop of Massa Marittima (1629–1655).

Biography
Giovanni Battista Malaspina was born in 1589.
On 13 Dec 1629, he was appointed during the papacy of Pope Urban VIII as Bishop of Massa Marittima.
On 13 Dec 1629, he was consecrated bishop by Carlo Emmanuele Pio di Savoia, Cardinal-Bishop of Albano, with Alessandro Filonardi, Bishop of Aquino, and Ranuccio Scotti Douglas, Bishop of Borgo San Donnino, serving as co-consecrators. 
He served as Bishop of Massa Marittima until his death on 16 Oct 1655.

References

External links and additional sources
 (for Chronology of Bishops) 
 (for Chronology of Bishops) 

17th-century Italian Roman Catholic bishops
Bishops appointed by Pope Urban VIII
1589 births
1655 deaths